Cepora julia is a butterfly in the family Pieridae. It is found on Sumba and Sumbawa.

Subspecies
The following subspecies are recognised:
Cepora julia julia (Sumba)
Cepora julia calliparga Fruhstorfer, 1910 (Sumbawa)

References

Pierini
Butterflies described in 1891
Butterflies of Indonesia